This is a list of obsolete technology which includes newer technologies that replaced the older ones. Many technologies that have newer alternatives have not been completely replaced.

Co-existence

Older technologies substantially co-existing with newer technologies include:
 Analog watches are still widely used for reasons of fashion and personal preference despite the availability of digital watches which can be made much lighter and with smart watch capabilities.
 CDs are still used in addition to MP3 players, however Smartphones with apps such as Spotify are more commonly used.
 DVDs have not been displaced by Blu-rays
 Fireplaces are still used for primary heat in some houses in developed countries, though furnaces, electric heat, and other modern HVAC systems are less polluting, can be better controlled, and can also provide cooling.
 Ferry travel has not been completely displaced by bridges and airplanes
 Fords are still used for rural roads, though bridges have replaced them for most roads in most developed countries
 Hammers have not been displaced by nail guns
 Hot water bottles continue to be used along with electric blankets and heating pads.
 Landline telephones are still used, despite the advent of mobile phones, although majorly for people who may struggle with modern technology.
 Long-distance travel by railroads and highway has to some degree been displaced by airplane, but not entirely - especially in countries adopting high-speed rail
 Postal mail continues to be used alongside email, but with substantial decreases in personal correspondence outside of special occasions, due to the availability of text messages and email
 Pneumatic tubes for passenger transport have been used in atmospheric railway to provide motive power, like a cable car system.  Vactrain systems, where the entire passenger compartment travels through an evacuated tube, never became operational, but are still being investigated for high-speed transport.
 Shields co-exist with bulletproof vests, and are used by riot police. Lighter-weight and stronger materials are available compared to ancient wooden and bronze shields, including clear plastic shields and bulletproof shields mounted on firing platforms.

See also
 Fad
 List of archaic technological nomenclature
 History of technology
 Obsolescence
Disruptive innovation

Obsolete technologies